Brian Honeycutt, best known by his stage name Kobe or Kobe Honeycutt, is an American R&B singer and songwriter from Chicago, Illinois. He is perhaps best known for his collaborations with American rapper Eminem, including 2010's "Talkin' 2 Myself" and "Cinderella Man", as well as 2014's "Die Alone".

Musical career
In 2007, Honeycutt wrote the refrain for 50 Cent and Akon's "I'll Still Kill", released as the fourth single from 50 Cent's third album Curtis (2007). In 2010, Honeycutt co-wrote Dr. Dre's "Kush", which features Snoop Dogg and Akon, and reached the Top 40 of the US Billboard Hot 100 chart. Also in 2010, Honeycutt was featured on Eminem's seventh album Recovery, on the song "Talkin' 2 Myself". In 2011, Honeycutt won a Grammy Award for Best Rap Album for his contributions on Recovery. In July 2013, Honeycutt released a song titled "G on It", under the pseudonym Kobe Killa.

Discography

EPs

Singles
As lead artist

As featured artist

Other charted songs

Guest appearances

Awards and nominations

Grammy Awards
{|class="wikitable"
!Year
!Nominated work
!Award
!Result
|-
| 2011
| Recovery (as featured artist and songwriter)
|Best Rap Album
|

References

External links
 
 
 
 

Living people
21st-century American singers
Year of birth missing (living people)
21st-century African-American male singers
African-American male songwriters
American hip hop singers
American male singer-songwriters
American rhythm and blues singer-songwriters
American soul singers
Musicians from Chicago
Singer-songwriters from Illinois
21st-century American male singers
Grammy Award winners for rap music